Weapon X is a fictional government genetic research facility project appearing in American comic books published by Marvel Comics. They are conducted by Department K, which turns willing and unwilling beings into living weapons to carry out covert missions like assassination or eliminating potential threats to the government. It is similar to Human enhancement experiments in the real world, but it captures mutants and does experiments on them to enhance their abilities such as superpowers, turning them into human weapons. They also mutate baseline humans. The Weapon X Project produced Wolverine, Leech, Deadpool, Sabretooth, and Weapon H.

The fictional experiment X, or the brutal adamantium-skeletal bonding process, written by Barry Windsor-Smith in his classic story "Weapon X" (originally published in Marvel Comics Presents #72-84 in 1991), was eventually revealed as part of the "Weapon X Project." Grant Morrison's  New X-Men in 2002 further revealed that Weapon X was the tenth of a series of such projects, collectively known as the Weapon Plus Program, and the X in "Weapon X" referred not to the letter X but the Roman numeral for the number 10. The first project, Weapon I, pertained to the Super Soldier Project that created Captain America.

Publication history
The Weapon X organization first appeared in The Incredible Hulk #180 and was created by Len Wein and John Romita Sr. and remains a relevant character in todays comics.

Fictional organization biography

Original installment

The codename Weapon X was originally mentioned in the first appearance of Wolverine in The Incredible Hulk #180 in 1974 since which it has been implied that he was connected to a shady and malevolent government program. In the 1991 Marvel Comics Presents story arc Weapon X, the project was designated Experiment X, and it was revealed that it was responsible for bonding the adamantium to Wolverine's skeleton, making him indestructible. It also subjected him to brainwashing in order to bring out his most basic murderous instincts and to transform him into the perfect assassin. The scientists christened their new killing machine "Weapon X".

Wolverine's solo series issues #48-50 (1992) revealed that Project X also created fabricated memories in the minds of several of its subjects.

Weapon X operated through Canada's Department K and was directed by Professor Andre Thorton. At his side were Dr. Abraham Cornelius, Dr. Carol Hines, and Dr. Dale Rice. John Sublime, the director of Weapon Plus, was always behind the scenes. Some of the work of Weapon X was based on the experiments detailed on the journals of Nazi scientist Nathan Essex which were obtained by Weapon Plus after the end of World War II.

The project's original test subjects were the members of Team X, a covert ops CIA team (consisting of Wolverine/Logan, Sabretooth/Victor Creed, Maverick/Christoph Nord, Silver Fox, Mastodon, Major Arthur Barrington, Psi-Borg/Aldo Ferro, Wildcat/Noel Higgins and Kestrel/John Wraith). The telepath Psi-Borg was involved in the creation of the victims' memory implants, in exchange for being endowed with immortality. The test subjects were policed by an adaptive robot enforcer, called Shiva, should any of the agents go rogue.

What Wolverine and his fellow X-Men ignored for many years is that Weapon X was part of a larger program called Weapon Plus, a United States super-soldier program created in the 1940s with the purpose of creating super-soldiers and assassins not only to be employed in conventional wars, but also to be employed for the extermination of mutants. Weapon X was the first iteration in Weapon Plus that victimized mutants.

What the Weapon X scientists did not foresee is that the experimentation on Wolverine would cause him to go on a murderous rampage, which allowed the escape of the other test subjects, and caused the death of Dale Rice, among dozens of other members of Weapon X staff, both scientists and military.

The Deadpool

Weapon X was temporarily shut down, but eventually was reinstated. Subsequent attempts at recreating the success seen by Weapon X with Wolverine include Native, Kimura and X-23 (the 23rd attempt to clone Wolverine who was designed to also hunt down rogue agents). The Weapon X Re-Creation Project a.k.a. The Facility was headed by Director Martin Sutter, Dr. Dale Rice's son Dr. Zander Rice, and Dr. Sarah Kinney. Like Weapon X once did, the Facility has also branched off from the main Weapon X Program. Latter creations of The Facility, now under the direction of Dr. Adam Harkins, include Predator X.

Second installment
At some point, Weapon X branched off from Weapon Plus' control and was solely headed up by Canada's Department K. A new generation of agents were created: Deadpool, Garrison Kane (who took on the moniker "Weapon X"), Slayback, Sluggo, Wyre, Wildchild, and Ajax, among others. Weapon X used Logan's DNA in order to endow its agents with healing powers. The batch produced many additional failures, which were sent to a facility for dissection to determine the cause of their failures. These rejects were freed by Deadpool when he escaped from the facility.

A smaller experiment was later developed by Department K with a New Zealand terrorist (who would become the third individual to be known as Weapon X) merging him with Thetagen-24: the most dangerous lethal symbiotic bacterial colony ever created.

Typhoid Mary was also a subject, when she was captured by an Antarctic facility continuing research for the Weapon X Project, specifically the mental faculties of the mutant mind. Their experiments helped give birth to Mary's "Bloody Mary" persona, which exhibited increased psychokinetic powers.

Third installment
In Weapon X series number 6, director Malcolm Colcord forms the third version of the Weapon X Project, designed to monitor and eliminate mutants. Colcord, once a security guard at the first Weapon X project, suffered severe facial lacerations during an escape attempt by the mutant Wolverine. Unlike the previous two installments of Weapon X, the third Project was completely U.S.-based and focused not only on the creation of living weapons, but also on the ultimate goal of Colcord, the creation of death camps.

The Director initially uses Weapon X as his personal strike force to exact revenge against Wolverine. He soon begins using its resources for the capturing and imprisonment of mutants in the secret government death camp called Neverland. Mutants who are not suitable to be used as military weapons would be executed, while those that are suitable are given the choice to join Weapon X or die. A number of mutants, such as Cecilia Reyes, Maggott, Ape, Tarbaby, Leech and many others were arrested by Weapon X's agents and sent to Neverland. Those mutants deemed useless to the project were killed in gas chambers, while others were brainwashed to become Weapon X operatives. The organs of the executed prisoners were then sent to the U-Men.

The agents of the third Weapon X were Agent Brent Jackson, a former S.H.I.E.L.D. agent; Sabretooth, who was given new adamantium implants; the shapeshifter Copycat; Deadpool; and Mauvais. Later on, Deadpool went rogue and new operatives were recruited into Weapon X, many of whom had their powers enhanced or were brainwashed into servitude. Maverick was saved from certain death and his powers were enhanced with the purpose of assassinating Wolverine, thus Agent Zero was created. Former member of Alpha Flight Wildchild was brainwashed and further mutated into a Nosferatu-like feral humanoid.

Former mutant terrorist Marrow had her powers set to a controllable level, restoring the young woman's natural beauty. Sauron's personality was merged with that of his Karl Lykos self and his energy-draining powers enhanced so he could fire energy blasts. Garrison Kane was further transformed into a cybernetic being. Aurora was kidnapped and brainwashed, like Madison Jeffries, who was extracted from the terrorist group known as the Zodiac and used to create hundreds of Boxbots loyal to Weapon X to serve as guards at Neverland.

Washout had his powers enhanced, though at a heavy cost. Each usage of his powers endangered his life and eventually, he dies trying to kill Colcord. Mesmero joins willingly, while Reaper and Wildside (former members of the Mutant Liberation Front) became agents of the program in exchange for their lives. The psychic mutant Jack-in-the-Box joins after his legs and arms were amputated. He becomes a living polygraph.

Unbeknownst to all except Sabretooth, Mister Sinister was disguised as the head scientist at the Neverland facility, Doctor Robert Windsor. As Windsor, Mister Sinister supposedly helped some mutants escape from Neverland, but he was only taking them to his own secret labs.

After some time, Brent Jackson (the only human officially on the team) took over as Director, during a mutiny by the team in conjunction with an attack by mutants from the Underground. Cable led this group, in a mission to destroy Weapon X and expose its existence and its human rights violations. Washout and Garrison Kane died in the event, while Sabretooth was washed away into the sewers after a battle with Marrow. Marrow used the battle to escape from Weapon X, eventually taking over the Mutant Underground, now reformed as the third incarnation of Gene Nation.

Colcord fled Weapon X with the always loyal Jeffries and Aurora as well. Director Brent Jackson's team consisted of Wildchild, Sauron, Agent Zero, Mesmero, Jack-in-the-Box, and newly recruited Chamber, whose face was restored by the program's scientists. Chamber was originally a double agent working for the X-Men, but was subsequently brainwashed into Jackson's service. Mister Sinister, under the alias of Dr. Windsor, remains at Weapon X. At some point, Jackson's team fought with Colcord's Boxbots. Colcord regains control of Weapon X.

Following M-Day, both Chamber and Mesmero are rendered powerless. Neverland is shut down and the prisoners, either powered or depowered, are executed by hosts of Boxbots. Records of the massive executions are discovered by Beast in the Endangered Species storyline, which also hints that some of the bodies of the prisoners executed prior to M-Day were sent to Ord and used in the research to develop the cure for mutation.

In the aftermath of the Avengers vs. X-Men storyline, Cyclops and his team of Uncanny X-Men have taken up residency in the Weapon X facility, which they have rebuilt into a school named the New Charles Xavier's School for the new mutants that began appearing.

Fourth installment
As part of the RessurXion event, a fourth installment of the Weapon X Project debuted. During the Weapons of Mutant Destruction storyline, the Weapon X Project is interested in Lady Deathstrike, Warpath, Domino, Wolverine, and Sabretooth for a new experiment. It is shown that the Weapon X Project is turning civilians into cyborgs made of Adamantium sent to hunt a specific group of mutants, forcing Old Man Logan to team up with Sabretooth to stop them. Old Man Logan and his allies alongside Amadeus Cho's Hulk form discover that Weapon X has been experimenting on humans by grafting the DNA of Wolverine and Hulk into them while also applying Adamantium to their bones. In addition, it is shown that the director of the latest incarnation of the Weapon X Project is a somehow-revived William Stryker.

The latest project H-Alpha emerges where it kills the lesser experiment H-Beta. Unfortunately, Dr. Aliana Alba lost control of it even when Amadeus Cho's Hulk form joins the battle while William Stryker and Dr. Alba get away. Following the fierce battle, H-Alpha flees causing Old Man Logan's group to go after it before the Weapon X Project plans to regain control of it.

When the Weapon X Project caught up to H-Alpha, Dr. Alba regained control of H-Alpha. She then stated to the controlled H-Alpha that he has a killer instinct where he is to kill anyone that the Weapon X Project wants him to kill. As Old Man Logan's group faces off against H-Alpha, X-23's Wolverine appearance was able to free Weapon H from Dr. Alba's control enabling Weapon H to leave the area so that he can remember who he was.

The "Hulkverines" miniseries showed Hulk and Wolverine's reactions to the Weapon X Project creating Weapon H and their search for them as well as dealing with the collaboration of Leader and Dr. Alba.

Implosion and Xeno emergence
Following Professor Charles Xavier founding a sovereign nation state for mutants on the living island Krakoa, he made sure all shadow agencies around the world were defunded and disbanded, Weapon X among them.

However remnants of those agencies gathered together and establishe Xeno a global organization with ties to anti-mutant politicians and business leaders.  Xeno are dedicated to bioengineering themselves into weapons. Upon discovering this, Professor X tasked Domino to infiltrate the organization to gather intel. Domino was discovered during her infiltration, and The Xeno's operatives used grafts of her skin on their genetically altered soldiers to allow them to evade Krakoa's security protocols.  The Xeno strike team was able to attack Krakoa, and assassinate Xavier.

The Weapon X codename
 In mainstream Marvel, Logan was the first individual known as Weapon X. After Wolverine, Garrison Kane went by the alias of Weapon X before leaving the Canadian Government to work as a mercenary again.
 A short time later, a New Zealand terrorist was captured by the Canadian Government and subjected to an experiment which bonded him to a bacteria colony, called Thetagen-24. This symbiosis proved dangerous as the union created a deadly energy field which could only be contained by an armored suit that was powered by the energy field.
 In the "Age of Apocalypse" alternate universe, Logan was known as Weapon X.

Series called Weapon X

1991 storyline
The chronicle of Wolverine's days with the Weapon X project, from the bonding of adamantium to his bones to his escape from the project, were revealed in the Weapon X story arc, written and illustrated by Barry Windsor-Smith and published in installments in the anthology series Marvel Comics Presents in 1991. An expanded version of the story has been produced by writer Marc Cerasini and published by Pocket Star Books in 2004. The story intertwines with some of Wolverine's past, and eventually ends with Wolverine's rampage being described in full, only to be revealed as the work of a Virtual reality system which actually predicted the events of Wolverine's escape which then occur in real life moments later.

Age of Apocalypse series
In 1995, Weapon X became the name of the Age of Apocalypse variation of Wolverine's ongoing series (during the "Age of Apocalypse" storyline, each X-Men series was renamed and renumbered for four monthly issues and then reverted to the original name and numbering after the storyline ended).

2002 ongoing series
Weapon X is the name of a 28-issue ongoing series published by Marvel from 2002 to 2004, featuring the third installment of the Weapon X project. It was written by Frank Tieri, who previously wrote the ongoing Wolverine title and had created the group's most recent incarnation in the pages of said book. The series began in 2002 and quickly gained critical praise for its use of minor characters as well as reviving characters such as Cable, who at the time wasn't featured in a monthly title. However, sales sagged following the removal of Cable from the book after the first year, on orders of Rob Liefeld, who was working on a new X-Force project. 

Frank Tieri was forced to drop nearly all of his subplots, including the introduction of a mutant concentration camp run by Mr. Sinister that featured many popular B-List mutant characters, and take the book into the controversial direction involving the introduction of X-23, and Wolverine and Sabretooth's quest to find the recently revived John Sublime. The new direction failed to catch on, mainly due to the books' over-exposure of Wolverine and the drastic change in tone of the book. It was cancelled with all of its storylines unresolved.

2005 limited series
A limited series Weapon X: Days of Future Now in 2005 was released that resolved all of the dangling storylines and revealed that Wolverine's disfigurement of Weapon X Director Malcolm Colcord was the catalyst for the creation of a future similar to the "Days of Future Past" scenario.

Wolverine: Weapon X
An ongoing series launched in 2009 titled Wolverine: Weapon X. The series was written by Jason Aaron and illustrated by Ron Garney.

2017 ongoing series
As part of their RessurXion event, a new ongoing series for Weapon X written by Greg Pak and illustrated by Greg Land was launched along with other new ongoing X-Men titles. This series takes place after the events seen in X-Men Prime when Lady Deathstrike gets kidnapped by the new version of Weapon X.

Membership

Other versions

Age of Apocalypse
In the Age of Apocalypse alternate timeline, Logan was never actually called Wolverine; he retained the "Weapon X" codename, through his entire career.

Dead Man Wade, the AoA counterpart of Deadpool, did not receive his healing factor from the Weapon X program but from Apocalypse, apparently after Apocalypse dismantled the program, and became part of Apocalypse's elite assassin trio dubbed the 'Pale Riders'.

Exiles

In the series Exiles, whose cast is a group of characters from alternate timelines who travel to other realities, Weapon X is a group of superbeings that have been torn from their respective realities to fulfill various missions for the Exiles' employer, the Timebroker. To return home, they have been forced to jump from reality to reality, repairing the broken links in the chain of time. Unlike their more heroic counterparts, the Exiles, this ruthless assemblage will resort to any means necessary to attain their goals. They act without mercy and without conscience.

The team's membership has changed through time. The first known mission given to Weapon X was to capture the Hulk. At the time, the membership of Weapon X consisted of Sabretooth (Victor Creed of the Age of Apocalypse, the father figure of the Exiles' leader Blink), Deadpool and Garrison Kane. Later it was revealed that the team also included Wolverine, Maverick and Mesmero. The six chose the name 'Weapon X' due to their common ties to the Project in their native timelines, although, save for Sabretooth, the background of all the other members are a mystery. The Exiles completed the mission without realizing the existence of Weapon X, but the Weapon X trio saw the Exiles and their leader, Blink.

When the two teams met face-to-face for the first time, Weapon X was already a sextet: Sabretooth, Deadpool, the Spider (Peter Parker, an alternate version of Spider-Man, here a psychotic murderer with the symbiotic alien costume of Carnage), Storm (Ororo Munroe, here only sixteen years old and already ruler of more than half of Africa), the Vision (a version that remained an emotionless robot), and the Hulk (Jennifer Walters, normally called the She-Hulk, here a former mob bookkeeper transformed into an eight-foot green-skinned powerhouse). It was mentioned that the Vision had replaced Kane and that the Spider had replaced Matt Murdock (Daredevil). Later, Iron Man replaced Deadpool.

The next time the team was seen, Angel (now a gun-toting assassin) replaced Iron Man and the team leader was now Gambit instead of Sabretooth. Later, the Hulk was replaced by Colossus, and eventually Angel was replaced by Ms. Marvel (Carol Danvers).

When Storm died, she was replaced by Hyperion. Later, Colossus and the Vision were replaced by the Hulk (Bruce Banner) and Firestar. These two, along with Gambit, tried to stop Hyperion, the Spider and Ms. Marvel when they decided to abandon their mission and rule a world. They failed, and the next mission given to both the Exiles and Weapon X was to kill enough members of each team so that there would be only six survivors in total. Ultimately, all members of this Weapon X team were killed in the fight.

Ultimate Marvel
In Ultimate X-Men, which takes place in the Ultimate Marvel universe, the Weapon X project has a similar intention and similar methodology as its Marvel Universe counterpart, as it was also responsible for bonding adamantium to Wolverine’s skeleton.

Ultimate Weapon X was headed by Colonel John Wraith, a mutant-hating commando, and Dr. Cornelius. The program was sanctioned by S.H.I.E.L.D. sometime before or during the Gulf War to capture mutants and force them to carry out covert missions for the US Government. Their main facility was located in Finland (as opposed to the mainstream that was originally located in Canada).  The lineup included, at times, Wolverine, Sabretooth, Rogue, Juggernaut, Nightcrawler, and the rest of the original Ultimate X-Men, for a short time after the program invaded Xavier's mansion and took them captive.

What If?

In an issue of What If? entitled "What If Wolverine Battled Weapon X," an alternate reality was shown in which Logan was never apprehended by the Weapon X Project. Weapon X attempted to kidnap Logan, but he managed to subdue his attackers and escape. Weapon X then turned their attention to a former Mountie and Marine named Guy Desjardins, who was brainwashed and subjected to the adamantium bonding process. Instead of claws, Desjardins manifested adamantium spikes that permanently protruded from his forehands (as 616-Logan's claws were the result of his mutation) and elbows. The experiment broke Guy's mind causing him to become fierce and go on a killing spree in the Weapon X facility. This made Guy Desjardins seem to be prone to violent outbursts and highly uncontrollable. Due to this, he had cybernetic armor that pumped adrenaline and narcotics into him. Unfortunately, this was ineffective because when Weapon X was released from the drugs, he went on a killing spree until the Weapon X soldiers drugged him once more.

To pass their failure onto someone else, the head of Weapon X had his men drop his body off at Department H with instruction saying "His codename is Weapon X. Make use of him." He was taken in by James Hudson for the Canadian superhero team dubbed The Flight much to the objection of Dr. Walter Langkowski. Guy Desjardins broke loose and went on another killing spree starting with Walter Langkowski. Dr. James Hudson had to use The Flight due to the lack of training. Guy Desjardins made it to Kenora where he killed Thomas who was the husband of Logan's friend Rose. When The Flight arrived, Stitch tried to use her powers on Guy Desjardins' harness only to be impaled by Guy Desjardins's adamantium spikes. When Smart Alec suggests that they call in the Avengers for help, Dr. James Hudson tells them that Department H cut off their communication when The Flight left and that it would take the Avengers too long to get to Canada. James Hudson then notified his assistant Chantilly to prep the Groundhog armor for him. Smart Alec thought of a plan and got close enough to disrupt the harness. This was partially successful where his body managed to compensate for the loss of adrenaline where Smart Alec was killed in the process.

When the remaining members pursued Guy Desjardins to Calgary, Saint Elmo grabbed Guy Desjardins and carried him into the air only for Weapon X to knock him out and cause Saint Elmo to get impaled upon a church's cross. Logan set out to hunt down Weapon X and discovered their ties with Department H. When Snowbird and Dr. James Hudson (wearing the Groundhog armor) were killed, Logan confronted Desjardins. After removing Desjardin's helmet, Logan managed to kill Desjardins. Government soldiers arrived to arrest Logan for the theft of government records. After Logan dove into the river to escape the soldiers, they thought he was dead when they found some of his blood. Days later, a news report that was all over the news had exposed the existence of the Weapon X Project and their involvement in Desjardins' attack upon people as well as Department H's role in the creation of The Flight. Watching television, Logan recovered from his wounds and found inner peace after avenging Thomas.

Wolverine: The End
In a possible future, Wolverine attempts to hunt down the people involved in Weapon X, and discovers not only that they have been dead and gone for many decades, but also what may have been the very first subject of the project: his elder brother John Howlett, who he had been told died when he (Wolverine) was still just a baby. In addition to having bone claws, enhanced senses and a healing factor, the elder Howlett appeared to have some kind of ethereal form which allowed him to phase through things and somehow conduct energy blasts. John Howlett claimed that he was driven mad at first by his parents' seeming abandonment of him when his powers first manifested. Had he been in his insane state of mind when he first encountered Wolverine, he claims he would likely have attempted to kill him.

In other media

Television
 In the X-Men animated series, the Weapon X program was responsible for Wolverine's adamantium implants and memory alterations. The program (directed by Professor Oyama and Dr. Cornelius) captured Logan, Sabretooth, Silver Fox, and Maverick and used a combination of false memory implants and brainwashing techniques in order to turn them into an elite team of mind-controlled assassins. Most of the experiments and training were administered at a secret research compound in Canada. There, Thorton and Cornelius forcibly laced Logan's skeleton with adamantium. Enraged by what was done to him, Logan broke free of his restraints and rampaged his way out of the facility. During the ensuing chaos, Sabretooth, Silver Fox, and Maverick were also able to escape.
 In X-Men: Evolution, Wolverine and Sabretooth were both shown to be subjects of Weapon X with a scientist operating a lab in Canada. Omega Red later mentioned other members such as Wraith.
 Weapon X is featured in the Wolverine and the X-Men episodes "Past Discretions" and "Stolen Lives". Like in the comics, Sabretooth, Maverick, and X-23 are agents of Weapon X while the program is led by Professor Andre Thorton and Dr. Abraham Cornelius. A proposed second season would have introduced Deadpool as part of Weapon X. A flashback also shows that Wolverine and Mystique were also part of Weapon X.
 Weapon X is mentioned in the Iron Man: Armored Adventures episode "The X-Factor." Pepper Potts was talking to War Machine and Iron Man via com-link about the background of Magneto. Magneto also reveals to Annie Claremont that as a boy, the Weapon X scientists did experiments on him (which hinted a link with Magneto and Weapon X).
 Weapon X briefly appears in The Avengers: Earth's Mightiest Heroes episode "Behold...The Vision". The Weapon X guards are briefly seen fighting Vision to no avail as Vision successfully steals Weapon X's adamantium supply.

Film

Live action
 In the X-Men film franchise, Wolverine is an amnesiac searching for clues to his past, which definitely includes participation in a paramilitary program that bonded adamantium to his skeleton, although the program was not named, nor was the program's country of affiliation mentioned. He also encounters Lady Deathstrike, who has been put through a similar procedure. X2: X-Men United introduced Colonel William Stryker, a military scientist who is directly involved in Wolverine's past, having invented the adamantium-bonding process and has performed other experiments on mutants such as developing a mind-controlling drug that he used on Lady Deathstrike, Magneto, Nightcrawler, and Cyclops. William Stryker is the film adaptation of the former military man turned-reverend in the God Loves, Man Kills graphic novel upon which X2 is partially based.
 In the 2009 film X-Men Origins: Wolverine, Wolverine is thrust into the Weapon X Program by Colonel William Stryker as a promise to kill his brother Victor Creed, who had faked the murder of Logan's girlfriend Kayla Silverfox to manipulate him. In the Alkali Lake Weapon X facility, Wolverine's skeleton bonds with adamantium. He then escapes the facility when he overhears that his memory will be erased. Weapon XI was portrayed in the film as a genetically-altered Wade Wilson / Deadpool. Weapon XI is referred to by Stryker as a "deadpool" possessing powers extracted from several mutants.
 Deadpool actor Ed Skrein revealed to MTV at the 2015 San Diego Comic Con that his character Ajax is part of Weapon X. While the program Wade enters isn't explicitly called "Weapon X" in the movie, it's still an underground facility that has scientists experiment on people to enhance their mutant powers similar to Weapon X in the comics. Ryan Reynolds, who portrays the titular character, confirmed in the Deadpool Honest Trailer that the facility was Weapon X.
 The program under the younger Stryker appears in the film X-Men: Apocalypse. Hugh Jackman appears as Weapon X, wearing headgear and costume based on Barry Windsor-Smith's designs from the Marvel Comics Presents #72-84 story arc.
 The Weapon X program is mentioned in Logan, where both Logan and Zander Rice acknowledge Rice's father as one of the men responsible for Logan's adamantium bonding in the new timeline.
 In the 1995 film Mallrats Brodie asks Jay Jason Mewes "Should I call you Logan, Weapon X?" to which he replies "No! Wolverine!"

Animation
 The Weapon X organization appears in the Wolverine portion of Hulk Vs. Professor Andre Thorton sends Team X (consisting of Omega Red, Sabretooth, Deadpool and Lady Deathstrike) to capture both Hulk and Wolverine in Professor Andre Thorton's plan to wipe their memories and use them as weapons. Short scenes of Logan past with Weapon X are shown in the movie like how he was captured and later cloned (a ref. to X-23). The Weapon X headquarters was destroyed during Team X's fight with Wolverine and Hulk.

Video games
 In Wolverine's Capcom fighting game appearances, such as Marvel Super Heroes, "Weapon-X" is also the name of a super move where Wolverine starts with a swift dash followed by an automatic combo then he finishes it off by leaping into the air head-first creating an energy X over his opponent.
 Weapon X is featured in X2: Wolverine's Revenge. It is the first level when Wolverine recounts what he remembers to Beast. Wolverine later returns there to find a cure for the deadly Shiva Strain Virus that acts as a failsafe implanted in Weapon X test subjects. Weapon X is also shown to be associated with the Void (a maximum security mutant detention center that's similar to the Vault, but holds mutant criminals).
 Weapon X is featured in X-Men Legends. A flashback level features Wolverine escaping from the Weapon X facility.
 The Weapon X facility is a hub in X-Men Legends II: Rise of Apocalypse
 X-Men: The Official Game expands upon Wolverine and Lady Deathstrike's involvement with Weapon X. Wolverine fights his way through the Weapon X Testing labs at Alkali Lake. Lady Deathstrike mentions that mutants were repeatedly burned to a crisp to test their healing factors, and that she and Wolverine are the only candidates to have survived the adamantium bonding process. Along the way through the labs, there are several names of victims of Weapon X above holding pens like Wolverine, Sabertooth, Maverick, and Deadpool.
 Weapon X is featured in the video game adaption to X-Men Origins: Wolverine. Known members are William Stryker, Dr. Abraham Cornelius, Dr. Carol Hines-Frost, and Nathaniel Essex (who was mentioned in a work log as one of the earliest scientists of the Weapon X Program).

Collected editions

First series

Second series

Third series

References

External links
 Weapon X at Marvel.com
 Knightmare6.com - Weapon Project FAQ
 Mutant High - Mutant Profiles
 weaponx.net.ru Alkali Lake

Villains in animated television series
Marvel Comics titles
X-Men titles
Fictional organizations in Marvel Comics
Works by Len Wein
X-Men supporting characters